Dharapani is a village development committee in Manang District in the Gandaki Zone of northern Nepal. At the time of the 2001 Nepal census it had a population of 1012 people living in 232 individual households.

References

Populated places in Manang District, Nepal